St Sebastian is a painting of c. 1614 by Peter Paul Rubens, showing the Christian Saint Sebastian. It dates to the early years of Rubens' stay in Rome - its sinuous line and defined figures are thought to be the result of his studies of Michelangelo and of Flemish Mannerism. It was bought by the Borghese directly from cardinal Neri Corsini in Brussels. It is now in the Borghese collection.

In 1618, Rubens wrote the English Sir Dudley Carlton a letter describing a collection of his own paintings he had at his home he wished to trade, including a painting of a naked St. Sebastian. It is more than likely not that this is that painting.

References

External links
https://web.archive.org/web/20070415205337/http://www.galleriaborghese.it/corsini/it/rubens.htm
http://www.wga.hu/html_m/r/rubens/10religi/13religi.html
http://www.peterpaulrubens.net/st-sebastian.jsp

Paintings by Peter Paul Rubens
1614 paintings
Paintings in the Borghese Collection
Rubens
Christian art about death
Paintings about death
Torture in art